was a Japanese photographer.

References

Further reading 
 
 
 Record of the International Symposium: Photography in Bakumatsu Japan

Japanese photographers
1841 births
1907 deaths